Robert James Gray is an Irish Anglican priest: he is the current Archdeacon of Ferns, Cashel, Waterford and Lismore.

Bob Gray was born in 1970, educated at Trinity College, Dublin and ordained in 1996. After a curacy at Clooney with Strathfoyle he has been based  at Ardamine since 1999. In 2004 he became Treasurer of Ferns Cathedral.

References

1970 births
Living people
Archdeacons of Ferns
Archdeacons of Cashel, Waterford and Lismore